Todd Barry (born March 26, 1964) is an American actor and stand-up comedian, best known for his deadpan comedy.

Life and career

Barry was born in The Bronx, New York, and grew up in Florida. He graduated from the University of Florida with a degree in English in 1986. Before starting in stand-up comedy, he was a drummer in the indie rock band The Chant from 1984 to 1985. In 1999, his Comedy Central Presents aired. He wrote, directed and starred in the short film Borrowing Saffron (2002), co-starring H. Jon Benjamin. He has made guest appearances on shows like Dr. Katz, Professional Therapist, Home Movies, Space Ghost Coast to Coast, Wonder Showzen, Tom Goes to the Mayor, and Aqua Teen Hunger Force. He also voices a recurring character on Squidbillies. In 2004, he was featured in the animated series Shorties Watchin' Shorties.

He made 16 appearances on Dr. Katz—in the first two, as himself; then as the recurring character of Todd, a video store clerk, in most of its final season episodes.  He also played a character in the television pilot Saddle Rash along with Sarah Silverman, H. Jon Benjamin and Mitch Hedberg. In "The Third Conchord", the twelfth and final episode of the first season of Flight of the Conchords, Barry played Todd, a bongo-playing megalomaniac, who tries to introduce the song "Doggy Bounce" to the Conchords' repertoire, and a new band name: The Crazy Dogggz.

In 2010, Barry had a recurring role as a fictionalized version of himself in the second season of the live-action Adult Swim series Delocated, where he played a frequent associate of the Russian mafia characters, casually playing card games with them in their club. He had a recurring role as himself in FX's Louie.

Barry recorded the album Super Crazy on Comedy Central Records in 2012 . In 2014, he was featured wearing shorts on Season 3, Episode 4 of Jerry Seinfeld's web show Comedians in Cars Getting Coffee.

Works

Discography
 Medium Energy (2001)
 Falling off the Bone (2004)
 From Heaven (2008)
 Super Crazy (2012)
 The Crowd Work Tour (2014)

Films
 Who's the Caboose? (1997) – Football Player
 Tomorrow Night (1998) – Man Caught in Rain (Director: Louis CK, 1998 Sundance selection)
 Los Enchiladas! (1999) – Duane (Director: Mitch Hedberg, 1999 Sundance selection)
 Road Trip (2000) – Campus Security Guard 1
 Pootie Tang (2001) – Greasy
 Borrowing Saffron (2002) – George (Director: Todd Barry, Woodstock Film Festival selection)
 Beer League (2006) – Creepy Guy Down the Shore
 The Wrestler (2008) – Wayne
 Pete Smalls Is Dead (2010) – Bob Withers
 Vamps (2012) – Ivan
 Wanderlust (2012) – Sherm
 Todd Barry: The Crowd Work Tour (2014) – Himself
 Spicy Honey (2017) – Himself

Television

 Aqua Teen Hunger Force, Romulox (three episodes)
 Dr. Katz, Professional Therapist – Himself
 At Home with Amy Sedaris – Handley
 Bored to Death – Dale Woodley
 Flight of the Conchords – Todd
 Wonder Showzen – Barold T. Mosley
 Sesame Street – #7
 Lucky Louie – Todd
 Talkshow with Spike Feresten – Himself-guest
 Chappelle's Show – Paul
 The Larry Sanders Show – Keith
 Spin City – Doug
 Sex and the City – Ordinary Guy
 Contest Searchlight – himself
 Tough Crowd With Colin Quinn – regular panelist
 Tom Goes to the Mayor – Saul
 Space Ghost Coast to Coast – Himself-guest ("Eat a Peach" episode)
 Home Movies – Video Store Clerk
 Lucy, the Daughter of the Devil – Ethan
 The Sarah Silverman Program – Nathan
 Louie – Fictional Version of Himself (eleven episodes)
 Delocated – Himself
 Bob's Burgers – Moo-Lissa, Joel
 Deadbeat – Daniel L. Turner
 Master of None – Todd

Books

 Thank You for Coming to Hattiesburg (2017)

Podcast appearances

WTF with Marc Maron – (Episode 11) October 8, 2009.
You Made It Weird with Pete Holmes – (Episode 33) March 21, 2012.
Hang Out With Me with Myq Kaplan – November 19, 2012.
The Nerdist Podcast with Chris Hardwick – (Episode 501) April 4, 2014.
WTF with Marc Maron – (Episode 486) April 7, 2014.
 TV Guidance Counselor podcast with Ken Reid – December 2, 2015.
The Best Show with Tom Scharpling – March 29, 2017.
Hello from the Magic Tavern – (Season 2, Episode 25) September 4, 2017.
R U Talkin' R.E.M. Re: Me? with Scott Aukerman and Adam Scott – (Episode 44) July 10, 2018.
Off Menu with Ed Gamble and James Acaster – March 10, 2021.
Office Hours Live with Tim Heidecker – June 3, 2021.

 The Downside with Gianmarco Soresi  - January 31, 2023.
In April 2013, Barry started his own eponymous podcast, The Todd Barry Podcast.

References

External links

 
 

1964 births
Living people
20th-century American comedians
21st-century American comedians
21st-century American Jews
American male comedians
American male film actors
American stand-up comedians
American male television actors
American television writers
American male television writers
American male voice actors
Jewish American comedians
Jewish American male actors
Coral Springs High School alumni